Hōkio Beach is a village and rural community in the Horowhenua District and Manawatū-Whanganui region of New Zealand's North Island.

It is located south of Waitarere Beach, west of Levin, and north of Waikawa Beach.

Demographics

The population of Hokio Beach was 183 in the 2018 New Zealand census, a decrease of 15 (-7.6%) since the 2013 census, and a decrease of 18 (-9.%) since the 2006 census. There were 93 males and 90 females, giving a sex ratio of 1.03 males per female. Ethnicities were 117 people  (63.9%) European/Pākehā, 75 (41.0%) Māori, 15 (8.2%) Pacific peoples, and 3 (1.6%) Asian (totals add to more than 100% since people could identify with multiple ethnicities). Of the total population, 30 people  (16.4%) were under 15 years old, 24 (13.1%) were 15–29, 90 (49.2%) were 30–64, and 42 (23.0%) were over 65.

Marae

The area has two marae:
 Kohuturoa Marae and Pāriri meeting house are a tribal meeting place for Muaūpoko.
 Ngātokowaru Marae and meeting house are a meeting place for the Ngāti Raukawa hapū of Ngāti Pareraukawa.

In October 2020, the Government committed $945,445 from the Provincial Growth Fund to upgrade Kohuturoa Marae and Kawiu Marae, creating 50 jobs. It also committed $106,414 to upgrade the Ngātokowaru Marae, creating 4 jobs.

References

Populated places in Manawatū-Whanganui
Horowhenua District